Since the UEFA Europa League was created in 2009, 61 different players from 31 countries have scored three or more goals (hat-tricks) on 73 occasions for 47 clubs from 19 countries. The first to do so was Liédson for Sporting CP against Dutch club Heerenveen on 17 September 2009, the first matchday of the new competition. Five players have gone on to score more than three goals in a match, with Radamel Falcao, Edinson Cavani, Willian José and Patson Daka managing four goals, and Athletic Bilbao's Aritz Aduriz scoring all five in a 5–3 win over Genk on 3 November 2016. Falcao has scored the most hat-tricks in the Europa League, with three, all for Porto in their victorious 2010–11 campaign; ten players have scored two Europa League hat-tricks, with only Raúl Bobadilla, Pierre-Emerick Aubameyang and Claudiu Keșerü doing so for two different clubs, and only Klaas-Jan Huntelaar and Diogo Jota doing so in consecutive appearances. Daka holds the record for the quickest hat-trick in the competition, with just nine minutes between his first and third goals for Leicester City against Spartak Moscow on 20 October 2021. João Félix is the youngest scorer of a Europa League hat-trick, with his three goals against Eintracht Frankfurt on 11 April 2019 coming at the age of 19 years and 152 days. Elvis Manu is the only player to have scored a hat-trick in a match his team lost, having done so in Ludogorets Razgrad's 4–3 loss to LASK on 29 October 2020. The season with the most hat-tricks was 2014–15, with twelve.

Hat-tricks
As of 23 February 2023

Multiple hat-tricks
Eleven players have scored more than one hat-trick in the UEFA Europa League; Radamel Falcao is the only player to do so three times, and only Raúl Bobadilla, Pierre-Emerick Aubameyang and Claudiu Keșerü have done so for multiple clubs.

See also
List of UEFA Champions League hat-tricks

Notes

References

Hat-tricks
Uefa Europa League